Frew Publications is an Australian comic book publisher, known for its long-running reprint series of Lee Falk's The Phantom. Frew formerly published other comics, including Falk's earlier creation Mandrake the Magician.

History
Frew Publications was founded in 1948 by Ron Forsyth, Lawford 'Jim' Richardson, Jack Eisen, and Peter Watson, with each contributing 500 Australian pounds to establish the publisher. The name "Frew" is an acronym made from the surnames of the four founders, Forsyth, Richardson, Eisen, and Watson. Eisen and Watson withdrew from the company before the first publication was issued.

Forsyth and Richardson approached Yaffa Syndicate the Australian representative of King Features Syndicate about producing an Australian comic book issue of The Phantom. The agreement was conditional that Frew could not print any stories that was currently running in other publications, nor any story soon after it had appeared in the Australian Woman's Mirror. The first edition of The Phantom, "The Slave Traders", published by Frew debuted on 9 September 1948. The first two issues were not numbered and printed in a landscape format, with the staples were on the short edge of the cover. The third issue, "Mr Hog", was the first to be numbered and reverted to the traditional portrait format.

Between 1949 and 1958 Frew also published comics including Popeye, The Phantom Ranger, The Shadow (an Australian creation not to be confused with the American version of The Shadow), Sir Falcon, Catman and Super Yank Comics, peaking to a total of thirty titles in the mid 1950s. One of its local titles, which apparently lasted only one issue, was The Suicide Squad, which predated the DC Comics group by seven years. In the early 1960s due to the influx of imported American titles Frew reduced their publications to a single title, The Phantom.
 
In November 1978 Frew published its first Swedish Phantom adventure entitled "The Ghost" (Issue #730), although it was not until January 1983 that another Swedish story appeared, "The Tiger from Rangoon" (Issue #763).

In 1987 Forsyth and Richardson engaged Jim Shepherd as a consultant, the following year he was employed as its managing director. Shepherd and Forsyth's son, Peter subsequently bought all the shares in the company. In 1995 Shepherd purchased Forsyth's shareholdings, becoming the sole owner of Frew Publications.

In 1990 Frew published the first ever Australian created Phantom adventure, "Rumble in the Jungle" (Issue #951A), with art by Keith Chatto and the story by Jim Shepherd. Chatto and Shepherd produced another two Phantom stories "Return of the Singh Brotherhood" (Issue #962) and "The Kings Cross Connection" (Issue #1000). Shepherd also wrote another story "The Search for Byron", published March 1996 (Issue #1131), which was illustrated by Glenn Ford.

On the 15 April 2013 Shepherd died of a heart attack at his Sydney home, at age eighty. He is survived by his wife Judith, who was also the senior editor at Frew Publications and son, Stephen.  In 2016, the company and licence was purchased by Glenn Ford and Rene White

Frew has a tradition of using their own cover art, created specially for the publisher.  Cover artists have included Tommy Hughes, Keith Chatto, Terry Welsby (credited as "Tessa"), Glenn Ford, Antonio Lemos, Meg Coates, Terry Lee, Paul Agnew, Jason Frazer, Jeremy MacPherson, Wai-Chew Chan, and Shane Foley Jamie Johnson.

In 2017, some of the classic Frew characters were revived in new adventures in a new series of Giantsize Phantom.  Stories include:
 "Sir Falcon: Riddles in Armour and Black" by Shane Foley
 "The Phantom Ranger: Phantoms" by Shane Foley
 "Sir Falcon": "The Stolen Chronicle" by Shane Foley
 "Planetman" by Shane Foley
 "Planetman" by Christopher Sequeira, Massimo Gamberi, and Luca Giorgi
 "The Shadow" by Jeremy MacPherson
 "The Phantom Ranger" by Felmang and Max Fish

The Phantom publishing chronology
The following section is a publishing chronology for the years when Frew used original titles. The first edition of The Phantom was issued in Australia in 1948 and it has today reached an estimated circulation of 25000 units. As of 2007, Frew sales figures place The Phantom'''s distribution above all other contemporary comic books sold in Australia. It also places first in duration of publication: in 2006 Frew celebrated 70 years of continuity, longer than any other Australian comics syndicate.

1948

1949

1950

1951

1952

Notes

Unnumbered editions
The following Frew editions were without edition numbers when issued. For ease of reference, official Frew archivists have assigned them either an 'A' or a 'B' as per their publishing date:
1
2
65A
76A
76B
817A
825A
840A
858A

Untitled editions
In editions 43-47, 49-821 and 823-828 no story title appeared on the front cover. Frew did not alter the official titles, which in most instances appeared at the start of the story.

Missing edition
Due to an accident in production, edition number 330 was never issued. Edition number 331 was substituted in its place. A retro "replica" #330 was later issued together with the 2019 Annual Special (#1830).

Exclusions
List is restricted to pure Phantom comic books; supplementary Frew editions and associated publications have been excluded.

References

Sources
 "Index: The First 50 Years of The Phantom''", compiled/edited by Jim Shepherd, first published by Frew Publications in 1998
 "The Phantom: A Publishing History in Australia", by Bryan Shedden

External links
 
 A History of Frew Publications
 Phantom Wiki

1948 establishments in Australia
Publishing companies established in 1948
Publishing companies of Australia
Comic book publishing companies of Australia